The American Journal of Human Genetics is a monthly peer-reviewed scientific journal in the field of human genetics. It was established in 1948 by the American Society of Human Genetics and covers all aspects of heredity in humans, including the application of genetics in medicine and public policy, as well as the related areas of molecular and cell biology. According to the Journal Citation Reports, the journal has a 2019 impact factor of 10.502. The journal is published by Cell Press an imprint of Elsevier. Bruce R. Korf became the editor-in-chief in the winter of 2017–2018.

Past editors-in-chief
 1948–1951 — Charles W. Cotterham
 1952–1954 — Herluf H. Strandskov (1898–1984)
 1955— Laurence H. Snyder
 1956–1961 — Arthur G. Steinberg
 1962–1963 — C. Nash Herndon
 1964–1969 — H. Eldon Sutton
 1970–1975 — Arno Motulsky
 1976–1978 — William J. Mellman
 1979–1986 — David E. Comings
 1986–1993 — Charles J. Epstein
 1993–1999 — Peter H. Byers
 1999–2005 — Stephen T. Warren
 2005–2011 — Cynthia C. Morton
 2011–2017 — David L. Nelson

See also 
 American Journal of Medical Genetics

References

External links 
 

Cell Press academic journals
Medical genetics journals
Monthly journals
Publications established in 1948
English-language journals
Academic journals associated with learned and professional societies of the United States